Mujezinović is a Bosnian surname.

Notable people with this surname include:
 Abedin Mujezinović (born 1993), Bosnian athlete
 Enver Mujezinović, Bosnian intelligence agent
 Haris Mujezinović (born 1974), Bosnian basketball player
 Mustafa Mujezinović (Bosnian politician) (1954–2019)
 Mustafa Mujezinović (Bosnian footballer) (born 1993)

Bosnian surnames